Nowe Chrusty  is a village in the administrative district of Gmina Rokiciny, within Tomaszów Mazowiecki County, Łódź Voivodeship, in central Poland.

References

External links
 Official town website

Nowe Chrusty